Malapterurus shirensis is a species of electric catfish native to the Zambezi River basin where it occurs in the countries of Mozambique, Zambia and Zimbabwe. This species grows to a length of  SL.

References

Malapteruridae
Fish of Africa
Fish of Mozambique
Fish of Zambia
Fish of Zimbabwe
Fish described in 2000
Strongly electric fish